Gasoline Alley was an American radio sitcom based on the popularity of the newspaper comic strip Gasoline Alley by Frank King. It first aired in 1931  under the name "Uncle Walt and Skeezix".

On February 17, 1941 the show returned on NBC Radio under the name "Gasoline Alley", with almost the same cast. Unusual at the time, it was a literal transfer of the storyline that had appeared in the comics pages that very same morning. It ran on NBC until April 11, 1941, and then switched to NBC's Blue Network on April 28, 1941. It ended its run on May 9, 1941.

The syndicated series of 1948–49 featured a cast of Bill Lipton, Mason Adams and Robert Dryden. Sponsored by Autolite, the program used opening theme music by the Polka Dots, a harmonica group. The 15-minute episodes focused on Skeezix running a gas station and garage, the Wallet and Bobble Garage, with his partner, Wilmer Bobble. In New York, this series aired on WOR from July 16, 1948 to January 7, 1949

Cast
 Skeezix: Bill Idelson, Jimmy McCallion
 Nina Clock: Janice Gilbert, Jean Gillespie
 Wumple: Cliff Soubier
 Ling Wee: Junius Matthews

Sources

External links
Glowing Dial: Gasoline Alley: "The Adventure of Jealous Jessica" (1948-49)
Radio America: Gasoline Alley, October 29, 1948.
Zoot Radio, free old time radio show downloads of Gasoline Alley

American comedy radio programs
American radio soap operas
1931 radio programme debuts
1949 radio programme endings
Radio programs about families
Radio programs based on comic strips
NBC radio programs
NBC Blue Network radio programs